The Gärstenhörner is a mountain in the Urner Alps, located on the border between the Swiss cantons of Bern and Valais. It lies on the range west of the Rhone Glacier, and east of the Grimsel Pass. The Gärstenhörner has three summits: the Mittler Gärstenhorn (3,189 m), the Hinter Gärstenhorn (3,173 m) and the Vorder Gärstenhorn (3,167 m).

References

External links
 Gärstenhörner on Hikr
 Ticinoinfoto: Gärstenhörner on www.flickr.com

Mountains of the Alps
Alpine three-thousanders
Mountains of Switzerland
Mountains of Valais
Mountains of the canton of Bern
Bern–Valais border